The term Rotterdam School is used to refer to a group of composers related to the city of Rotterdam.

What started in the final decade of the twentieth century within a small circle of composition students at the Rotterdam Conservatory with a manifesto by Rotterdam composer Oscar van Dillen, has been taken more seriously now in larger musical circles. Many Rotterdam composers have made successful careers in contemporary or theatre music.

It is impossible to accommodate all Rotterdam composers together in one kind of style or musical æsthetic. Therefore, one could not really speak of a school in the traditional meaning of the word. 

The colloquium (called "practicums") at the Rotterdam Conservatoire, led by composition teachers Peter-Jan Wagemans and Klaas de Vries, played an important, unifying role.

Composers
Thorkell Atlason
Erik de Clerq
Nuno Corte-Real
Oscar van Dillen
Rocco Havelaar
Bart de Kemp
Hans Koolmees
Astrid Kruisselbrink
Andreas Kunstein
Marcel Minderhoud
Philemon Mukarno
Florian Magnus Maier
Christina Viola Oorebeek
Joey Roukens
Felipe Pérez Santiago
Edward Top
Marc Verhoeven
Klaas de Vries
Peter-Jan Wagemans
Juan Felipe Waller
Evrim Demirel
Dimitris Andrikopoulos

References

External links
 Rotterdamse School in Theater Lantaren/Venster at Nieuwsbank
 Elektronische muziek in de Rotterdamse School at Lantaren Venster
 Doelenkwartet Rotterdam String Quartets

Dutch music
Rotterdam
Composers by city